Tmall, formerly Taobao Mall, is a Chinese-language website for business-to-consumer (B2C) online retail, spun off from Taobao, operated in China by Alibaba Group. It is a platform for local Chinese and international businesses to sell brand-name goods to consumers in Greater China. It has over 500 million monthly active users, as of February 2018. In the last few years, it has opened its features to brands, not only for online sales but also for developing brand awareness. According to Alexa Rank, it is the third most visited website globally in 2021.

History
Tmall.com was first introduced by Taobao in April 2008 as Taobao Mall, a dedicated B2C platform within its consumer e-commerce website. The key difference between Tmall and Taobao is Tmall is a B2C platform but Taobao is C2C.

In November 2010, Taobao Mall launched an independent web domain, tmall.com, to differentiate listings by its merchants, who are either brand owners or authorized distributors, from Taobao's C2C merchants. Meanwhile, it kicked off a US$30 million advertising campaign to raise brand awareness among consumers. It also announced an enhanced focus on product verticals and improvements in shopping experience.

In June 2011, Alibaba Group Chairman and CEO Jack Ma announced a major restructuring of Taobao through an internal email. It was reorganized into three separate companies. As a result, Tmall.com became an independent business under Alibaba Group. The other two businesses that resulted from the reorganization are Taobao Marketplace (a C2C marketplace) and eTao (a shopping search engine). The move was said to be necessary for Taobao to "meet competitive threats that emerged in the past two years during which the Internet and e-commerce landscape has changed dramatically".

In October 2011, Tmall.com experienced two successive waves of online rioting since it significantly increased fees on online vendors. The service fees raised from 6,000 yuan ($940) to 60,000 yuan ($9,400) a year, and a compulsory fixed sum deposit gone from 10,000 yuan ($1,570) to up to 150,000 yuan ($23,500). According to Tmall.com, the price increase was intended to help weed out merchants that are too often a source of fakes, shoddy products and poor customer service. Stores that earn top ratings for service and quality from customers and high sales volumes are entitled to partial or full refunds.

On January 11, 2012, TMall.com officially changed its Chinese name to Tiān Māo (天猫), the Chinese pronunciation of Tmall, which literally means “sky cat”.

Tmall occupied 51.3% Chinese B2C market online product sales share in Q1 2013.

In February 2014, Alibaba launched Tmall Global as a cross-border marketplace for foreign brands and merchants to sell directly to Chinese consumers. The cross-border model requires merchants no longer to have a legal entity in China nor hold stock in the country. Some of the biggest flagship stores on Tmall Global include Costco from the US and dm-drogerie markt from Germany.

After Houston Rockets general manager's tweet about Hong Kong, Tmall delisted any items related to the organization from its sites.

Metrics
Tmall.com was registered on October 17, 1997, with Alibaba Cloud Computing (Beijing) Co., Ltd. Tmall currently features more than 70,000 international and Chinese brands from more than 50,000 merchants and serves more than 180 million buyers.  Tmall.com ranked number one among all Chinese B2C retail websites for 2010 in terms of transaction volume, with a gross merchandise volume of RMB30 billion – about three times the amount facilitated by 360buy, its closest competitor. The site accounts for a 47.6% share of the B2C online retail market in China, followed by 16.2% of 360buy and 4.8% of Amazon.cn.

According to Alexa, as of June 2021, Tmall.com was the 3rd most visited website in the world and the 1st most visited website in China.

Features
Alipay, an escrow-based online payment platform owned by Alibaba Group, is the preferred payment solution for transactions on Tmall.com.

As on Taobao Marketplace, the C2C e-commerce platform under Alibaba Group, buyers and sellers can communicate prior to the purchase through AliWangWang, its proprietary embedded instant messaging program. It has become a habit among Chinese online shoppers to “chat” with the sellers or their customer service team through AliWangWang to inquire about products, engage in bargaining, etc. prior to purchase..

Unlike online sales on marketplaces like Amazon, the operation of a TMall shop requires a specialized and dedicated cross-functional team. Such a team can either be employed by the merchant inhouse or, as in most cases, is managed through a certified Tmall Partner Agency ("TP") which operates the store on an ongoing basis on behalf of the shop owner.

Since 2017, TMall decided to provide merchants with a dedicated channel meant to support them with their new launches, called TMall Heybox. TMall Heybox offers vendors tremendous a large set of highly sophisticated digital marketing tools. Moreover, TMall HeyDrop raffle tool and TMall Heybox’s product trial tool can be very useful for enhancing brand awareness and collect shoppers’ feedback about their newly launched items.

Vietnam 
Alipay entered Vietnam in 2010, with network up to 21,000. Ant Financial hopes that their network in Vietnam could help Chinese order, tourists, that are heading to Vietnam.Currently in Vietnam, to pay via alipay, you can use Davitrans, the address of a company specializing in Chinese purchases.

References

External links
Official website 

Alibaba Group
Online auction websites of China
Internet properties established in 2008
2008 establishments in China
Chinese brands